James Martin Lafferty (born July 25, 1985) is an American actor, director, and producer. He is best known for his portrayal of Nathan Scott on The WB/CW teen drama television series One Tree Hill (2003–2012).

Early life
Lafferty was born in Hemet, California to Angelica and Jeffrey Lafferty, who own a local construction company. He has a younger brother, actor Stuart Lafferty.

Having worked as an uncredited extra on television shows including Beverly Hills, 90210 and Dr. Quinn, Medicine Woman, Lafferty received his first significant acting role in a school play when he was ten years old. Lafferty attended Hemet High School (where he played on the school's basketball team) until 2003, after which he enrolled at California State University, Long Beach. At age eighteen, he moved to Wilmington, North Carolina, having been cast as Nathan Scott in One Tree Hill.

Career
In 1997, at age twelve, Lafferty made his small-screen acting debut with a voice-over role in the made-for-television film Annabelle's Wish. Lafferty has since made guest appearances on television series' such as Once and Again, Get Real, and Boston Public. In 2002, Lafferty starred in the ESPN made-for-television film A Season on the Brink, an adaptation of the book of the same name by John Feinstein. The film centered on the 1985–86 season of Indiana University's college basketball team.

In 2003, Lafferty was cast in his breakout role of Nathan Scott on The WB/The CW teen drama series One Tree Hill. The series follows two estranged half-brothers, Nathan and Lucas Scott, who are put on the same basketball team, jeopardizing Nathan's position as the star player. In May 2011, The CW renewed the series for a ninth and final season, for which Lafferty chose to return on a recurring basis rather than in a full-time starring role. Over the course of the later seasons, Lafferty directed four episodes. He received four Teen Choice Award nominations throughout his time on the series.

In February 2008, Lafferty was cast in the straight-to-DVD sequel to the cult film Donnie Darko. Titled S. Darko, the film was released in May 2009, and received mostly negative reviews from critics. In April 2011, Lafferty was confirmed to star alongside One Tree Hill castmate Stephen Colletti and brother Stuart Lafferty in a planned adventurous reality television series entitled Wild Life: A New Generation of Wild, for which he was an executive producer. A pilot episode was filmed, however the series failed to find a network. In 2013, Lafferty was cast in the NBC crime thriller series Crisis, as Mr Nash. This was followed by landing the lead role of Jimmy Adams in the independent movie Waffle Street, alongside Danny Glover, and being cast in a recurring role during the first season of WGN America's slave drama Underground. In August 2015, Lafferty directed an episode of the second season of E! drama series The Royals, and returned to direct a few more episodes during season three.

Personal life
Lafferty currently resides in Los Angeles, California. He dated his One Tree Hill co-star Sophia Bush from 2008 to 2009. He dated Bono's daughter, actress Eve Hewson, from 2010 to 2015. He then began dating Australian actress Alexandra Park in 2015 after meeting on the set of The Royals, when Lafferty directed several episodes. The couple became engaged on September 7, 2020.  They got married on May 23, 2022 in Hawaii.

Filmography

Film

Television

Other works

Awards and nominations

References

External links

 
 
 James Lafferty on Instagram

1985 births
21st-century American male actors
American male film actors
Male models from California
Television producers from California
American television directors
American male television actors
Basketball players from California
California State University, Long Beach alumni
Living people
Male actors from California
People from Hemet, California
American men's basketball players